Delcambre is a town in Iberia and Vermilion parishes in the U.S. state of Louisiana, located  east of Abbeville on Louisiana Highway 14 in the Cajun Heartland of Acadiana. Bayou Carlin, also known as the Delcambre Canal, passes through the town and is home for much of the local fishing industry. The population was 1,866 at the 2010 census, down from 2,168 at the 2000 census.

Delcambre is part of the Lafayette, Louisiana metropolitan statistical area.

History
When the King of Spain made Louisiana a gift to his brother-in-law, the King of France, settlers of French heritage began to occupy the area. Brothers Charles and Louis Delcambre came from Belgium to settle in the area between the two towns now known as Delcambre and New Iberia. Louis' son, Poufette Delcambre, settled further to the west in what is now known as Pouffette Station.  Pouffette's son, Desire Delcambre, was the founder of the town of Delcambre. The first post office was opened on May 17, 1877, and the town was incorporated on November 27, 1907.

In 2005, much of the town was flooded by the storm surge forced inland by Hurricane Rita. The mayor of Delcambre was quoted as saying that only 25 of 900 homes in the town were not flooded.

The Delcambre town council and Mayor Carrol Brousard passed an ordinance in June 2007 making sagging illegal, expanding an existing state indecent exposure law to add underwear to the list of what cannot be exposed.

Geography
Delcambre is located on the border of Vermilion and Iberia parishes at  (29.950207, −91.988815). Louisiana Highway 14 passes through the north side of the town, leading east  to New Iberia and west  to Abbeville.

Demographics

Historically, the area that became known as Delcambre was first settled by Acadians who were expelled from Nova Scotia in the mid-18th century.

As of 2006, 74.2% of the town population spoke English, 24.2% French (including Cajun), and 1.5% Spanish.

As of the 2020 United States census, there were 1,793 people, 748 households, and 500 families residing in the town. As of the census of 2000, there were 2,168 people, 826 households, and 593 families residing in the town. The racial makeup of the town was 82.70% White, 14.44% African American, 0.88% Native American, 0.51% Asian, 0.05% Pacific Islander, 0.23% from other races, and 1.20% from two or more races. Hispanic or Latino of any race were 1.89% of the population.

There were 826 households, out of which 35.6% had children under the age of 18 living with them, 51.0% were married couples living together, 16.3% had a female householder with no husband present, and 28.1% were non-families. 24.2% of all households were made up of individuals, and 12.2% had someone living alone who was 65 years of age or older. The average household size was 2.62 and the average family size was 3.10.

In the town, the population was spread out, with 27.7% under the age of 18, 10.9% from 18 to 24, 27.4% from 25 to 44, 21.4% from 45 to 64, and 12.6% who were 65 years of age or older. The median age was 33 years. For every 100 females, there were 95.0 males. For every 100 females age 18 and over, there were 89.9 males.

The median income for a household in the town was $27,500, and the median income for a family was $34,643. Males had a median income of $27,750 versus $17,438 for females. The per capita income for the town was $13,245. About 17.4% of families and 20.2% of the population were below the poverty line, including 25.1% of those under age 18 and 19.2% of those age 65 or over.

Education
Residents of Delcambre in both Vermilion and Iberia parishes are zoned to the Iberia Parish School System.

Residents in Delcambre are zoned to Delcambre Elementary School and Delcambre High School.

References

External links
 Town of Delcambre official website
 Vermilion Parish Tourist Commission
 Vermilion Historical Society

Acadiana
Towns in Louisiana
Towns in Iberia Parish, Louisiana
Towns in Vermilion Parish, Louisiana